The UGM-133A Trident II, or Trident D5 is a submarine-launched ballistic missile (SLBM), built by Lockheed Martin Space in Sunnyvale, California, and deployed with the American and British navies. It was first deployed in March 1990, and remains in service. The Trident II Strategic Weapons System is an improved SLBM with greater accuracy, payload, and range than the earlier Trident C-4. It is a key element of the U.S. strategic nuclear triad and strengthens U.S. strategic deterrence. The Trident II is considered to be a durable sea-based system capable of engaging many targets. It has payload flexibility that can accommodate various treaty requirements, such as New START. The Trident II's increased payload allows nuclear deterrence to be accomplished with fewer submarines, and its high accuracy—approaching that of land-based missiles—enables it to be used as a first strike weapon.

Trident II missiles are carried by 14 US  and 4 British  submarines, with 24 missiles on each Ohio class and 16 missiles on each Vanguard class (the number of missiles on Ohio-class submarines will be reduced to 20 each starting in 2023, in compliance with the New Strategic Arms Reduction Treaty). The D5 is the sixth in a series of missile generations deployed since the sea-based deterrent program began 60 years ago. The Trident D5LE (life-extension) version will remain in service until 2042.

History

The Trident II was designed with greater range and payload capacity than its predecessor (Trident C-4). In 1972, the US Navy projected an initial operating capability (IOC) date of 1984. The US Navy shifted the IOC date to 1982. On 18 October 1973, a Trident program review was administered. On 14 March 1974, the US Deputy Secretary of Defense disseminated two requirements for the Trident program. The first was an accuracy improvement for the Trident C-4. The second requirement asked for an alternative to the C-4, or a new Trident II missile with a larger first-stage motor than the C-4.

The U.S. Navy conducted studies to determine whether the more expensive Trident II could be constructed similarly to the US Air Force's MX ICBM, primarily to decrease budget costs. Modifications to the guidance system, electronics hardening, and external protective coatings were incorporated into the design. While this satisfied the Navy's study requirements, it did not accommodate the US Air Force payload requirements.

Propulsion stages were proposed to be used between the first stage and second stage motors, effectively making the Trident II a longer three-stage missile than the C-4. Studies were delayed in 1978 when Congress only approved $5 million of the suggested $15 million for the Navy and Air Force program studies. By December 1978, the Navy's and the Air Force's own studies agreed with each other that a similar missile structure would not achieve desired savings. It was determined that the Navy and Air Force would maintain and be responsible for their own unique weapon systems. The US Navy continued with its own design of the Trident II.

In March 1980, US Secretary of Defense Harold Brown proposed an increased level of funding for the submarine-launched ballistic missile modernization, emphasizing increased accuracy. The House Armed Services Committee (HASC) recommended no funding, while the Senate Armed Services Committee (SASC) recommended full funding of $97 million. The SASC asked for a plan incorporating "the fullest possible competition . . . [and] should consider competing among contractors for each major component, including the integrated missile." $65 million was awarded for the submarine-launched ballistic missile modernization.

On 2 October 1981, President Reagan called for the modernization of the strategic forces. The Defense Department directed the Navy to fund all development of the Trident II D5 missile with a December 1989 IOC. All research and development efforts would be directed toward "a new development, advanced technology, high accuracy Trident II D5 system." In December 1982, Deputy SECDEF Frank Carlucci advised the Secretary of Defense Caspar Weinberger to include funding for a new reentry vehicle–warhead combination for Trident II. The reentry vehicle was to be designated as the Mk 5, which was to have a greater yield than the Mk 4. The development contract for Trident II was issued in October 1983. On 28 December 1983, the deputy SECDEF authorized the Navy to proceed with full-scale engineering development of the Trident II D5.

An initial series of 19 land-based Trident II launches took place from Cape Canaveral Launch Complex 46 from 15 January 1987 to 27 January 1989. The launch attempt failed four seconds into the flight because the plume of water following the missile rose to a greater height than expected, and water was in the nozzle when the motor ignited. Once the problem was understood, relatively simple changes were quickly made, but the problem delayed the IOC of Trident II until March 1990. IOC for SWFPAC completed on schedule in 2001, allowing Trident II SSBN to be deployed in the Pacific theater.

In 1980, the United Kingdom adopted the missile as part of its Trident nuclear program.

Design
The Trident II is a three-stage rocket, each stage containing a solid-fuel rocket motor. The first motor is made by Northrop Grumman. This first stage incorporates a solid propellant motor, parts to ensure first-stage ignition, and a thrust vector control (TVC) system. The first-stage section, compared to the Trident C-4, is slightly larger, allowing increased range and a larger payload. In addition to a larger motor, the D-5 uses an advanced and lighter fuel binder (polyethylene glycol) than the C-4. This fuel is more commonly known as NEPE-75. (NEPE stands for nitrate ester plasticized polyether, the 75 represents that the fuel contains 75% solids.) The solid components bound by fuel binder are HMX, aluminum, and ammonium perchlorate.

Both the first- and second-stage motors are connected by an interstage casing, which contains electronic equipment and ordnance for separation during flight. The second stage also contains a motor made by Thiokol and Hercules Inc., parts to ensure the second-stage ignition, and a TVC system. The first and second stages are both important to the structural integrity of the missile. To ensure that the stages maintain a maximal strength-to-weight ratio, both stages are reinforced by a carbon-fiber-reinforced polymer hull.

The second and third-stage sections are connected by an integrated equipment/adapter section (ES). The equipment/adapter section is modified to be shorter and more compact than the C-4's adapter section. The D-5's equipment section contains critical guidance and flight control avionics, such as the Mk 6 navigation system. The equipment section also contains the third-stage TVC system, ordnance for ejecting from the second-stage motor, and the MIRV platform. The nose fairing shields the payload and third-stage motor. Mounted within the nose cap (above the nose fairing) is an extendable aerospike. This aerospike effectively decreases drag by 50%. The third-stage hull is also reinforced by carbon fiber and kevlar.

The Trident II is the first missile of the US Navy's Fleet Ballistic Missile program to incorporate a 3D printed component.

While Lockheed Martin is the prime contractor, a variety of corporations work on the Trident II. For example, in October 2020, Boeing was contracted for maintenance, rebuilding and technical services for the Trident II navigation subsystem, and Northrop Grumman was contracted for engineering support and integration for the Trident II and relevant submarines at sites and shipyards from Sunnyvale, California, and Bangor, Washington, to Kings Bay, Georgia, and Cape Canaveral, Florida, among other locales. Peraton was contracted for program support services on the Trident II reentry subsystem, and Systems Planning & Analysis Inc. was contracted for Trident II technical services, program support, assessments, special studies, and systems engineering.

Sequence of operation

Before the launch sequence is initiated, the on-board MARK 6 navigation system is activated. The specified mission trajectory is loaded onto the flight computer.

Once the launch command is given, a steam generator system is activated, igniting a fixed solid-grain small rocket motor. The exhaust is fed into cooling water, causing expanding gas within the launch tube to force the missile upward, and out of the submarine. Within seconds, the missile breaches the surface of the water and the first-stage Thrust Vectoring Control (TVC) subsystem ignites. This enables hydraulic actuators attached to the first-stage nozzle. Soon after, the first-stage motor ignites and burns for approximately 65 seconds until the fuel is expended; in addition, an aerospike atop the missile deploys shortly after first-stage ignition to shape airflow.  When the first-stage motor ceases operation, the second-stage TVC subsystem ignites. The first-stage motor is then ejected by ordnance within the interstage casing.

Once the first stage is cleared, the second-stage motor ignites and burns for approximately 65 seconds. The nose fairing is then jettisoned, separating from the missile. When the nose fairing is clear of the missile, the third-stage TVC subsystem ignites, and ordnance separates the second-stage motor. The third-stage motor then ignites, pushing the equipment section the remaining distance (approx. 40 seconds) of the flight. When the third-stage motor reaches the targeted area, the Post Boost Control System (PBCS) ignites, and the third-stage motor is ejected.

The astro-inertial guidance uses star positioning to fine-tune the accuracy of the inertial guidance system after launch. As the accuracy of a missile is dependent upon the guidance system knowing the exact position of the missile at any given moment during its flight, the fact that stars are a fixed reference point from which to calculate that position makes this a potentially very effective means of improving accuracy. In the Trident system, this was achieved by a single camera that was trained to spot just one star in its expected position. If it was not quite aligned to where it should be, it would indicate that the inertial system was not precisely on target and a correction would be made.

The equipment section, with the MIRV, then aims the reentry vehicles (RV) towards the earth. The payload is then released from the MIRV platform. To prevent the PBCS correctional thrust from interfering with the RV when released, the equipment section initiates the Plume Avoidance Maneuver (PAM). If the RV will be disrupted by the PBCS nozzle's thrust, the nearest nozzle will shut off until the RV is away from the MIRV. The PAM is used only when a nozzle's plume will disrupt the area near an RV. The PAM is a specialized design feature added to the Trident II to increase accuracy.

Warheads
In US service Trident II can be loaded with up to eight Mk-5 RVs with 475-kt W88 warheads, up to fourteen Mk-4A RVs with 90-kt W76-1 warheads, and up to fourteen Mk-4A RVs with 5–7-kt W76-2 warheads. In practice, each missile on average carries four warheads due to the warhead limitations placed by the New START treaty.

The system previously carried the Mk-4 RV with a 100kt W76-0 warhead, but beginning in September 2008 W76-0s were converted to W76-1s. This process was completed by December 2018. Conversion from the W76-0 to W76-1 involved fitting the warheads with a new RV (the Mk-4A), replacing age limited components and fitting the warhead with a new MC4700 arming, fusing and firing (AF&F) system. The MC4700 AF&F system (dubbed the "super fuze") significantly improves warhead kill probabilities against hardened targets such as silos or bunkers. The W76-2 is also fitted with the Mk-4A RV and MC4700 fuze.

In the National Nuclear Security Administration's 2021 budget request, the agency requested US$53m to begin development of a new W93 warhead for use on Trident II and US$32 million to begin development of a new Mk-7 RV. If approved, the W93 will be the first new nuclear weapon system to receive a type designation since the end of the Cold War. It is unclear if the W93 will replace the W76-1, the W88 or both warheads.

In UK usage Trident II missiles are equipped with a warhead called Holbrook and have a maximum yield of 100kt. The UK government insists the warhead is a British design, but analysts believe that it is largely based on the US W76 design. In 2011 it was reported that British warheads would receive the new Mk 4A reentry vehicles and some or all of the other upgrades that US W76 warheads were receiving in their W76-1 Life Extension Program. Some reports suggested that British warheads would receive the same arming, fusing and firing system (AF&F) as the US W76-1. Under a 1958 agreement, the US supplies the UK with blueprints of its own warhead designs but the design, manufacture and maintenance of UK warheads are purely a UK responsibility. AWE is currently developing a new warhead to replace the existing Holbrook warhead with deployment expected in the 2030s.

Additional specifications
 Range (exact is classified): Full load: ~ Reduced load: ~
 Guidance system: The MK 6 Astro-inertial guidance navigation system. Inertial guidance is most favored for the initial guidance and reentry vehicles of strategic missiles, because it has no external signal and cannot be jammed.
 CEP: Requirement: <.  (Information from flight tests is classified.)

Operators

The Royal Navy operates its missiles from a shared pool, together with the Atlantic squadron of the U.S. Navy Ohio-class SSBNs at King's Bay, Georgia. The pool is co-mingled and missiles are selected at random for loading on to either nation's submarines.

Trident II missile submarines

See also
 JL-2
 Pukkuksong-1
 M45 (missile)
 M51 (missile)
 R-29RMU Sineva
 R-29RMU2 Layner
 R-39 Rif
 RSM-56 Bulava
 K Missile family

References

External links 
 

Articles containing video clips
Cold War submarine-launched ballistic missiles of the United States
Cold War weapons of the United States
Lockheed Corporation
Nuclear weapons of the United States
UGM-133
Trident (UK nuclear programme)
Submarine-launched ballistic missiles
Military equipment introduced in the 1990s
fr:Trident (missile)#Trident II (D5) UGM-133A